The Sarıyer–Çayırbaşı Tunnel is a twin-tube road tunnel under the northern suburbs of Istanbul, Turkey connecting Sarıyer district and Çayırbaşı neighborhood in the same district.

The tunnel is part of a project of the Istanbul Metropolitan Municipality to build seven tunnels for the "City of Seven Hills", which is the nickname of Istanbul. It was opened on 8 September 2012 as the third tunnel of this project following the Kağıthane–Piyalepaşa Tunnel and Dolmabahçe–Bomonti Tunnel. Its south entry is situated in Hacıosman Bayırı at Çayırbaşı neighborhood while the northern entry is located in Kilyos Street in Sarıyer.

References

Road tunnels in Turkey
Buildings and structures in Istanbul
Tunnels completed in 2012
Sarıyer
Tunnels in Istanbul